Sergey Ostapchuk (born 10 February 1976) is a retired Russian swimmer who won two bronze medals at the World and European championships in 1999. He also competed in the 100 m and 200 m backstroke events at the 1996 and 2000 Summer Olympics but did not reach the finals.

He has retired from senior swimming, but is still competing in the masters category. He lives in Vladivostok.

References

1976 births
Russian male swimmers
Living people
Swimmers at the 1996 Summer Olympics
Swimmers at the 2000 Summer Olympics
Male backstroke swimmers
Olympic swimmers of Russia
European Aquatics Championships medalists in swimming